High Point is a city in the Piedmont Triad region of the U.S. state of North Carolina. Most of the city is in Guilford County, with parts extending into Randolph, Davidson, and Forsyth counties. High Point is North Carolina's only city that extends into four counties. As of the 2020 census the city had a total population of 113,887 with an estimated population of 114,086 in 2021. High Point is the ninth-largest municipality in North Carolina, the third-largest municipality in the Piedmont Triad metropolitan area, and the 259th-largest city in the U.S.

Major industries in High Point include furniture, textiles, and bus manufacturing. The city's official slogan is "North Carolina's International City" due to the semi-annual High Point Furniture Market that attracts 100,000 exhibitors and buyers from around the world. It is home to High Point University, a private Methodist-affiliated institution founded in 1924.

History

High Point was at the highest point of the 1856 North Carolina Railroad between Charlotte and Goldsboro, where it intersected the 1852 Great Western Plank Road. Its central location and transportation allowed for the delivery of raw materials like cotton and lumber as well as import and export of processed goods, contributing to its early growth. High Point was settled by Europeans, including English Quakers and German immigrants, before 1750, but was not incorporated until 1859. Before it became a major manufacturing center, the most important industries were tobacco, woodworking and textiles. The High Point furniture factory opened in 1889. High Point College was founded in 1924 as a private Methodist-affiliated institution. The college later became a liberal arts university, now with approximately 4,400 undergraduate and graduate students from 51 countries and 46 states.

Historic places
Sites on the National Register of Historic Places

Geography

High Point is the only city in North Carolina that exists within four counties: Davidson, Forsyth, Guilford and Randolph. It also stands within two major watersheds: the Yadkin–Pee Dee to the west and the Cape Fear to the east. Parts of the city rise above , making it among the highest cities in North Carolina's Piedmont.

It is bordered by Greensboro to the north, Jamestown to the northeast, and Archdale to the southeast. The city limits of Trinity and Thomasville come within half a mile of High Point's city limits to the south and southwest, respectively.

Climate
High Point experiences a humid subtropical climate. Summers are hot and humid, and the dew points will often climb to near or even above  by late June through much of August. Nights usually remain warm above 70 degrees. About once every 5 to 10 years the city will climb to or above . Winters are cool to cold. Nights average near , with the coldest averages in the upper 20s from late December through early February. About once every 10 years the minimum will dip below  and to near or below  approximately once every 20 years. Daytime highs average near  in the winter, with the coldest stretch between late December through early February with highs averaging in the upper 40s. Most winters there will be 2 to 4 days that remain below freezing.

Rainfall patterns are generally spread evenly throughout the year, with between seven and eleven wet days per month. In addition to snowfall, some years the city can be impacted by significant ice storms. Cold air wedging up on the east side of the mountains can lock this part of the state into cold air while warmer moist air moves in aloft. This proximity to the mountains creates what is known as the Appalachian Wedge and can produce crippling ice storms.

High Point was one of several communities affected by a 2010 tornado outbreak. The twister reached its most powerful EF3 classification as it crossed the northern suburbs of the city.

In 1989, High Point sustained minor wind damage from Hurricane Hugo as it raced through the western Piedmont region of North Carolina after making landfall 5 hours away in Charleston, South Carolina.

Demographics

2000 census
As of the census of 2000, there were 85,839 people, 33,519 households, and 22,523 families residing in the city. The population density was 1,750.1 people per square mile (675.7/km). There were 35,952 housing units at an average density of 733.0 per square mile (283.0/km). The racial makeup of the city was 54.56% White, 34.77% African American, 0.46% Native American, 4.45% Asian, 0.02% Pacific Islander, 2.27% from other races, and 1.57% from two or more races. Hispanic or Latino of any race were 6.89% of the population. 12.7% were of American, 8.7% English, 8.3% German  and 5.9% Irish ancestry.

There were 33,519 households, of which 32.9% had children under the age of 18 living with them, 46.9% were married couples living together, 16.3% had a female householder with no husband present, and 32.8% were non-families. Of all households, 27.2% were made up of individuals, and 9.5% had someone living alone who was 65 years of age or older. The average household size was 2.49 and the average family size was 3.03.

In the city, the population was spread out, with 26.0% under the age of 18, 9.3% from 18 to 24, 31.8% from 25 to 44, 21.0% from 45 to 64, and 11.9% who were 65 years of age or older. The median age was 34. For every 100 females, there were 91.5 males. For every 100 females age 18 and over, there were 87.6 males.

The median income for a household in the city was $40,137, and the median income for a family was $48,057. Males had a median income of $33,411 versus $25,293 for females. The per capita income for the city was $21,303. About 10.5% of families and 13.2% of the population were below the poverty line, including 18.6% of those under age 18 and 11.4% of those age 65 or over.

2010 census
As of the census of 2010, there were 104,371 people, and 40,988 households residing in the city. The population density was 1,939.9 people per square mile. There were 46,677 housing units in the city. The racial makeup of the city was 53.6% white (50.4% Non-Hispanic white), 33.0% Black or African American, 0.6% Native American, 6.1% Asian, 0.0% Pacific Islander, and 2.3% from two or more races. Hispanic or Latinos of any race were 8.5% of the population.

2020 census

As of the 2020 United States census, there were 114,059 people, 40,877 households, and 25,792 families residing in the city.

Economy

Diversification
Though historically focused on production of furniture, hosiery, and Hatteras Yachts, High Point diversified its economy by becoming a center for distribution and logistics, customer service, banking, manufacturing, photography and pharmaceuticals. The High Point Market remains important to High Point's economy and the city's furniture industry. Its bi-annual trade show is the largest furniture and furnishings industry event in the world. It is held in April and October of each year. Approximately  of showroom space is used by 2,300 exhibitors, in 188 separate buildings. Over 100 countries are represented through both vendors and visitors.

Evolution of furniture industry
High Point was an early center for the development of the furniture industry in the South. Functional furniture had been produced on a small scale since the 17th century by artisans of English ancestry who had settled in North Carolina. As the farming landscape of the South began to change with the end of the Civil War and slavery, cheap labor became available during the Reconstruction Era. The North Carolina furniture industry gained momentum in the late 19th century, and developers were attracted to High Point for its location, transportation, and cheap labor. The city was in the center of the Piedmont region with access to vast hardwood forests in the central and western parts of the state. High Point, at the junction of the railroad and a main state road, provided a centralized shipping point for the southern market. An agricultural depression of the 1890s drove farm workers to developing towns like High Point looking for industrial jobs.

Factories were needed to produce affordable wooden household furniture for the southern market. The first furniture company, the High Point Furniture Manufacturing Company, was formed in 1889. Subsequently, from 1890 to 1900, 38 new furniture factories opened in the state, with 13 of those in High Point. The Southern Railway line was formed in 1894, and High Point was shipping eight fully loaded freight cars of furniture each day by 1898. By the turn of the century, High Point had become the leading furniture center in the South, with over 40 furniture companies in the city and the surrounding area. Meanwhile, other manufacturers set up local factories to provide related products like veneers, plate glass, mirrors, paint, and locks to furniture companies.

Profits in the North Carolina furniture industry declined with the increasing number of factories. In addition to the increased competition for market shares, by 1910 the salary for competent experienced workers and rising shipping costs had cut further into the profit. Bankruptcies resulted from inexperienced managers who tried to sell products below the cost of production and companies that tried to expand too quickly. An innovative High Point company, Tomlinson Chair Co., devised incentives to give its workforce an opportunity to receive part of the profits. The company was one of the first to manufacture period reproduction dining and living room furniture on a large scale. Employees who exceeded monthly quotas received a percentage bonus. All workers received a life insurance policy as well.

Marketing became important to growth of the furniture industry in North Carolina in the twentieth century. Store owners had to visit the factory to select their orders due to the large size and weight of the furniture. This situation improved at the turn of the century with the mass marketing and sales of North Carolina furniture from the catalogues of Sears Roebuck and Co. At the same time, competitors in large cities like New York and Chicago held a national exposition twice a year to display the manufacturers' products and to take orders from furniture dealers and buyers. Recognizing the need for a more convenient southern location, High Point furniture manufacturers began planning for an exposition to display and sell their product to the public. The first North Carolina furniture exposition was held in High Point in 1905. The event that became known as the High Point Furniture Market was attended by 700 buyers and generated $2.25 million in sales. High Point overtook Chicago as the site of the nation's most important semi-annual furniture show. Gradually the High Point Furniture Market, held in April and October, grew into an internationally renowned furniture trade fair for home furnishings. High Point continues to be the prime U.S. location to purchase brand-name furniture at a substantial discount.

The furniture industry and developing textile manufacturing set the pace for two 20th century growth booms in High Point. Over the decade of the 1920s, the population grew from 14,302 to 36,745 as $20 million of building permits were issued and $26 million was spent on city improvements. The Great Depression did not seem to affect the southern furniture market, which focused on trendy and affordable furniture, while those in the North focused on traditional, luxurious products. By 1935, North Carolina was second only to New York in US furniture production. Meanwhile, the High Point Market continued to set furniture trends and to be a national economic indicator; the $5 billion in sales in 1947 after World War II forecast a postwar boom. The 1950s' growth of the furniture market mirrored that of High Point's second population boom from 39,973 in 1950 to 62,063 in 1960. By 1959, North Carolina had surpassed New York to become the state employing the most people in the furniture industry. In 1961, The State magazine declared, "High Point, in Guilford County, is the world's leading manufacturing center of wood furniture. It is also the location of one of the nation's principal furniture markets." Four international furniture shows were being hosted by High Point at that time, including the High Point Market (still known then as the Southern Furniture Exposition), which The State reported was drawing crowds of five to six thousand buyers. Throughout the end of the 20th century, North Carolina continued to lead the nation in the production of both upholstered and wooden household furniture. The furniture was slightly styled and inexpensive, but lost its regional characteristics. Some local artisans still maintained a unique and high quality wooden product. High Point became known as the "Furniture Capital of the World" in the 1980s during the golden era of North Carolina furniture manufacturing.

The globalization of the 1990s opened free trade and competition from foreign furniture manufacturers. US companies, unable to compete, began outsourcing to Latin America and Asia. China became the leading manufacturer by producing furniture of equal quality at a lower price. The majority of furniture companies in North Carolina have continued to close since the 1990s. The furniture makers who have maintained a high quality product made from solid wood continue to maintain a unique niche and are sold in both the United States and Asia.

The High Point Museum showcases an exhibit, "High Point's Furniture Heritage", which examines the historical relationship between the furniture industry and the people of High Point. The Bienenstock Furniture Library located in downtown High Point is the largest furniture specialty library in the world and contains over 4,000 furniture and design-specific volumes.

High Point Market and home furnishing goods
The High Point Market has been noted for being a significant part of the region's larger furniture "cluster," discussed most recently by sociologist Richard Florida and initially by economist Michael Porter.  The Market and its effects on the city have also been the focus of an extensive case study by urban sociologist John Joe Schlichtman. In this research, High Point's ability to capture the global furniture merchandising market is said to signal a new era in what is possible for small cities. Along these lines, Schlichtman terms High Point a "Niche City", "a city that forges global centrality by creating an economic specialization in a specific segment of the global service economy." In 2005, High Point adopted "North Carolina's International City" as its official slogan, emphasizing the role of international business and especially the High Point Market (formerly called the International Home Furnishings Market), the largest furnishings industry trade fair in the world.

Since 2005, the High Point Market has been receiving increasing competition from the huge World Market Center project in Las Vegas, which, if fully built according to its multi-stage plan, will exceed the High Point Market in square footage. In February 2011, speculation developed that Las Vegas World Market Center interests were positioning to purchase a controlling stake in the High Point Market. If so, World Market Center interests would control 64% of the square footage in downtown High Point.

Top employers
According to High Point's 2018 Comprehensive Annual Financial Report, the top employers in the city are:

Transportation
Amtrak's Crescent, Carolinian and Piedmont trains connect High Point with the cities of New York, Philadelphia, Baltimore, Washington, Richmond, Raleigh, Charlotte, Atlanta, Birmingham and New Orleans. The recently refurbished historic High Point Amtrak station is at 100 West High Street.

Interstate 85 runs through southern High Point, southeast of the original interstate roadway, which is now designated Business 85. The new Interstate 74 runs north and east of the city. This section is referred locally as the "East Belt" freeway project, and was completed southeast to I-73/US 220 near Randleman in 2013. To the northwest, it extends to Interstate 40 in Winston-Salem.

The Piedmont Authority for Regional Transportation (PART) operates in High Point. It is a service that shuttles people among most of the cities in the northwestern Piedmont region of North Carolina. The main service for public transportation in High Point is Hi tran, the local bus service.

Highways passing through High Point include:
  Interstate 74
  Interstate 85
  Interstate 85 Business
  U.S. Route 29
  U.S. Route 70
  North Carolina Highway 62
  North Carolina Highway 66
  North Carolina Highway 68
  North Carolina Highway 610

Education

Private schools for children were established in and around High Point as early as the early nineteenth century by Quakers. The New York Yearly Meeting of the Society of Friends, a network of Quakers from that state, started a school in Asheboro in the 1880s for African American students. The school relocated to High Point in 1891 on land east of town on Washington Street. The institution was named the High Point Normal and Industrial School (later William Penn High School), and was administered by the Quakers until 1897. In that year, black educator Alfred J. Griffin accepted the position of principal and led the establishment into a long period of growth. The school closed in 1968, but was renovated and reopened in 2003 as Penn-Griffin School for the Arts, a public arts magnet high school. It is one of three public high schools in the city.

The High Point public school system was founded in 1897 with the approval of a $10,000 bond, in part to finance the purchase of J. Elwood Cox's family home on South Main Street for use as the first school building. Twelve school commissioners were appointed to administer the 350-student system of five grades. Growth of the city's institutions reflected improved primary educational facilities. A school building campaign coupled with additional grades and improved classes resulted in four additional schools for white students: Elm Street School (1905), Park Street School (1910), Fairview School (1910), and Grimes Street School (1911). Many other schools were born in the 1920s during a period of rapid growth.

This building spree culminated in 1927 with the opening of High Point High School. Among the many high styled school complexes in the state, few surpass High Point's grand 1927 high school. The campus joined the talents of two designers, Greensboro architect Harry Barton and Charlotte landscape architect Earl S. Draper. The building was matched in 1931 with the addition of Ferndale Middle School just to the east, designed to incorporate details from the high school so that it maintained a campus theme. Both shared athletic facilities on a large tract of land between downtown and Emerywood. In 1962, High Point High School's name was modified to High Point Central High School when an additional high school, T. Wingate Andrews High School, was established in the 1960s.

Several private and independent schools are found in High Point, including High Point Christian Academy (Baptist), High Point Friends School (Quaker), Immaculate Heart of Mary (Catholic), Wesleyan Christian Academy (Wesleyan),  and Westchester Country Day School (nonsectarian), and Phoenix Academy, a charter school.

In 1921, the Chamber of Commerce made the establishment of a college in High Point a high priority and initiated a High Point College campaign. The campaign solicited funds in order to attract the attention of the North Carolina Methodist Protestants, who had desired for decades to found a college.

High Point College opened in 1924 (changed to High Point University in 1991) with three buildings at various stages of development. Many of the numerous civic organizations founded in the 1920s pledged funds, including the Rotary, Kiwanis, Civitan, and the American Business Club. The architectural design of the High Point College campus was in keeping with traditional and historical architectural initiatives found at many private colleges and universities across the state in the 1920s. The administration building (Roberts Hall), male and female dormitories (McCulloch Hall and Women's Hall, respectively), and a central heating plant were all erected between 1922 and 1924 according to designs by Washington, D.C. architect R. E. Mitchell with assistance by High Point architect Herbert Hunter. Today, High Point University is a four-year, coeducational, liberal arts university related to the United Methodist Church. It offers 50 majors in a traditional day format. It also offers non-traditional evening programs, and the graduate studies program offers 10 master's degrees and one doctorate degree.

High Point is one of the nine Shaw University "CAPE" (College of Adult and Professional Education) program centers. Guilford Technical Community College maintains a High Point campus.

Providence Bible College & Seminary (Baptist) operates in High Point, offering degrees from Bible Diploma to Doctorate Degree. High Point was also the home of John Wesley University (formerly called Laurel University and John Wesley College), which merged into Piedmont International University in Winston-Salem in 2018.

Media

Newspapers
The High Point Enterprise, established in 1885, is the only daily newspaper published in High Point. HP Magazine is a full-color glossy lifestyle magazine that offers stories on food, history, events, the furniture industry, and more. The monthly magazine is the city's largest locally owned publication. Greensboro's News & Record is available in High Point. Triad City Beat, Yes! Weekly and Qué Pasa are free weekly papers covering High Point and the rest of the Triad area.

Television stations
High Point makes up part of the Greensboro/Winston-Salem/High Point television designated market area.  These stations are listed by call letters, channel number, network and city of license.

 WFMY-TV, 2, CBS, Greensboro
 WGHP, 8, FOX, High Point
 WXII-TV, 12, NBC, Winston-Salem
 WGPX, 16, ION, Burlington
 WCWG, 20, CW, Lexington
 WUNL-TV, 26, PBS/UNCTV, Winston-Salem
 WLXI-TV, 43, TCT, Greensboro
 WXLV-TV, 45, ABC, Winston-Salem
 WMYV-TV, 48, MyNetworkTV, Greensboro

Attractions

 Bernice Bienenstock Furniture Library: World's largest collection of books on the history of furniture and interior design. Home of the Pat Plaxico Sculpture Gardens.
 Castle McCulloch Gold Mill: McCulloch Gold Mill was built in 1832 and operated primarily as a gold processing center serving local gold mining operations. Now open as a special events center.
 High Point City Lake Park: Recreation and amusement park located on the shores of  lake with boating, fishing, paddle boats, picnic areas with shelters, fishing boat and canoe rentals, historic carousel, train, waterslide, largest outdoor swimming pool in the state, miniature golf, gymnasium, playground and excursion boat. Site of annual "Day in the Park" festival each September.
 High Point Community Theatre: Founded in 1976, High Point Community Theatre (HPCT) presents American musicals, dramas and comedies performed by local actors.  HPCT also has an education program, featuring classes, workshops and camps for adults, youth and children.
 High Point Museum and Historical Park: Museum commemorating the history of High Point, coupled with interpretative exhibit of log Blacksmith Shop and 1786 Haley House.
 High Point Public Library: A massive full-service public library contains nearly 400,000 books, music recordings, videotapes, audiobooks, periodicals, newspapers, and a comprehensive collection of books related to history and genealogy equipped with many attractions for Youth and Young Adults.
 Millis Regional Health Education Center: Interactive health education center with features depicting facets of human anatomy and health.
 Museum of Old Domestic Life: Quaker museum established around 1926 in 1858 Springfield Meeting House, containing a broad selection of artifacts from typical colonial Quaker homesteads.
 Piedmont Environmental Center: Features  of hiking trails adjacent to High Point City Lake, nature preserve, small animal exhibits, the North Carolina Mapscape, and access to an eight-mile (13 km) Greenway Trail.
 Rosetta C. Baldwin Museum: The museum was created in November 2000 to honor the legacy of Miss Rosetta C. Baldwin, her family and many African-Americans. The site depicts a typical home of a southern African American family during the mid-twentieth century.
 Sechrest Gallery: Located on the campus of High Point University in the Hayworth Fine Arts Center, the Sechrest Gallery houses permanent collections of 18th and 19th century British Art coupled with rotating exhibitions.
 Theatre Art Galleries: Housed in the High Point Theatre since 1975, the Theatre Art Galleries (TAG) hosts exhibitions of contemporary visual art. TAG has been the sole independent nonprofit provider of the visual arts in High Point and includes one of the finest stage and gallery spaces in the Southeast.
 Truist Point: a baseball park, home of the High Point Rockers in the Atlantic League of Professional Baseball.
 World's Largest Chest of Drawers: Built in 1926, the World's Largest Bureau is an example of automobile-oriented pop architecture and has been featured on numerous broadcasts such as MTV and The Travel Channel.

Notable people 

 Alma Adams, politician 
 Stefon Adams, former NFL cornerback
 Bam Adebayo, NBA player for the Miami Heat
 Luke Appling, baseball player for the Chicago White Sox, inducted into Baseball Hall of Fame in 1964 
 Tony Baker, former NFL running back
 Brandon Banks, NFL defensive lineman
 Fantasia Barrino, Grammy Award-winning singer and season 3 winner of American Idol
 Ricco Barrino, singer and brother of Fantasia Barrino, American Idol, Grammy Award-winning singer
 Heather Bergsma, Olympic bronze medalist in speed skating
 Dave Blaney, NASCAR driver
 Ryan Blaney, NASCAR driver
 Cliff Bolton, MLB catcher
 Brandt Bronico, Major League Soccer player
 J. T. Brown, ice hockey player; son of Ted Brown
 Ted Brown, former Minnesota Vikings running back and College Football Hall of Fame inductee
 Dorothy R. Burnley, businesswoman and politician
 James H. Burnley IV, lawyer
 James P. Cain, United States Ambassador to Denmark
 Benny Carter, painter and sculptor
 Lawrence Chandler, composer, music producer, founder of Bowery Electric 
 John Coltrane,  jazz saxophonist, was born in Hamlet and moved to High Point shortly after birth, remained through high school
 Dick Culler, former MLB player
 Bill Davis, owner of Bill Davis Racing of NASCAR
 James Dickey, National Book Award-winning poet, author of Deliverance
 Johnny Evans, former NFL player for the Cleveland Browns
 Gary Fortune, former MLB player for the Philadelphia Phillies and Boston Red Sox
 Cindy Garner, actress and model
 Marcus Gilchrist, NFL safety
 Anthony Dean Griffey, opera singer
 William Hayes, NFL defensive end
 J. D. Hayworth, U.S. congressman representing Arizona (1995–2007) 
 Ray Hayworth, former MLB catcher
 Red Hayworth, former MLB player for the St. Louis Browns
 Elizabeth Horton, winner of the 2006 Miss North Carolina pageant
 Greg Jeffries, former NFL player for the Detroit Lions and Miami Dolphins
 Gene Jones, professional golfer
 Sammy Johnson, former NFL running back
 Cathy Johnston-Forbes, former professional golfer on the LPGA Tour
 Adam Lazzara, lead singer of Taking Back Sunday
 Jimmie Lewallen, NASCAR driver
 Jenn Lyon, actress
 Nadia Moffett, Miss North Carolina USA 2010 
 Wil Myers, MLB player
 Quincy Miller, NBA player
 Jim Paschal, NASCAR driver
 Theo Pinson, NBA player 
 Eddie Pope, professional soccer player
 Nido R. Qubein, president of High Point University, businessman and motivational speaker
 Harrison Rhodes, NASCAR driver
 Junior Robinson, former NFL cornerback
 Clyde Simms, professional soccer player in the MLS
 Emily Spivey, television writer, producer and creator of the series Up All Night and Bless the Harts, the latter is based on her life growing up in Greensboro and High Point 
 Perley A. Thomas, founder of Thomas Built Buses
 Maxwell Thurman, U.S. Army general who helped develop the longtime "Be All You Can Be" Army recruitment campaign
 Tony Washington, former NFL wide receiver
 Drew Weaver, professional golfer
 Brian Williams, former NFL cornerback
 Harry Williamson, Olympic middle-distance runner
 Adrian Wilson, former NFL safety
 Kevin Witt, former MLB player for the Toronto Blue Jays, San Diego Padres, Detroit Tigers, and Tampa Bay Rays
 John William Wofford, Olympic equestrian rider

See also

 List of municipalities in North Carolina
 Piedmont Triad

References

External links

 
 
 High Point Chamber of Commerce
 Visit High Point

 
Cities in Davidson County, North Carolina
Cities in Forsyth County, North Carolina
Cities in Guilford County, North Carolina
Cities in North Carolina
Cities in Randolph County, North Carolina